The Nuckle Brothers were a third wave ska band from Huntington Beach that was part of the early 1990s music scene in  Orange County, California, United States, inspiring such bands as Reel Big Fish, Save Ferris and The Aquabats.

History
Playing their first show in March 1992 at the Ocean View High School Battle of the Bands, the Nuckle Brothers quickly built up a local following. They were known for their high energy, sloppy and unpredictable stage shows. Their sound was a combination of high-speed ska with full horn sections and punk rock energy.

The original band went through about 20 members, playing shows with such ska heavyweights as Bad Manners, The Busters, No Doubt, Dance Hall Crashers, Sublime, Skelatones, Skankin' Pickle, Reel Big Fish, Suburban Rhythm and many more before breaking up in 1995. Since then they have done a string of reunion shows throughout the country. 

The Nuckle Brothers released a few cassette tapes on their own that were distributed well around the Orange County area, primarily around Huntington Beach and Costa Mesa. Some local record shops that helped promote the band with their tape distribution were Bionic Records, Vinyl Solution and Noise, Noise, Noise. The band released their first compact disc on Surreal Records during the early to mid-1990s, titled Kickin Ass, Gettin Loco, Drinkin Lotsa Nuckle Cocoa. Surreal Records was run by friend and Bionic Records employee Jason Shad. The label only had one release, their debut CD; it was later reissued by another label in the early 2000s that was run and operated by another friend, James Scoggins.

Members

Recent members
Ashley Hibbs, vocals
John Pantle, vocals, trombone
Long Nguyen, bass
T-Bone Willy, trombone
Mason St Peter, tenor saxophone
Oliver Zavala, trumpet
Dave Gironda, guitar
The Bubba Master, trumpet
Aaron Bradford, keyboards, organ
Phil Hanson, drums

Earlier members
Ben, trombone
Rio, trumpet
Matt Davis, vocals
Donny Miller, vocals 
Scott Moran, guitar 
Gabe Palmer, drums
Brandon Wells, percussion
Joe Munsinger, keyboards
Joni Ressinger, tenor saxophone
Scott Klopfenstein, trumpet
Yoshi Nakamoto, drums
Paul Costuros, guitar
Charles Han, alto saxophone

Founding members
Aaron Bradford, organ
Paul Costuros, guitar
Matt Davis, vocals
Ashley Hibbs, vocals, trumpet
Yoshi Nakamoto, drums
Long Nguyen, bass

References

American ska musical groups